In basketball, points are the sum of the score accumulated through free throws or field goals. The VTB United League's scoring title is awarded to the player with the highest points per game average in a given regular season.

Scoring leaders

 There was no awarding in the 2019–20, because the season was cancelled due to the coronavirus pandemic in Europe.

References

External links
 VTB United League Official Website 
 VTB United League Official Website 

VTB United League statistical leaders